Henry Moffat (December 20, 1855 – March 25, 1926) was a physician in Yonkers, New York. Mark Twain was one of his clients. He caused the building of a tuberculosis hospital. He was a member of a draft board during World War I.

Moffat also attended Princeton University, where he was a prominent football player. He kicked off the first Princeton–Yale game in 1873. He was also a golfer; a member of the "Apple Tree Gang" and St. Andrew's golf club.

References

External links

Princeton Tigers football players
Princeton Tigers baseball players
Sportspeople from Yonkers, New York
19th-century American physicians
19th-century players of American football
1855 births
1926 deaths